The 1979 Miami Dolphins season was the franchise's 10th season in the National Football League, the 14th overall, and the 10th under head coach Don Shula. Prior to the start of the season, the Dolphins re-signed Larry Csonka who left to join the WFL after the 1974 season. Despite struggles from Bob Griese all year, the Dolphins finished 10-6 and won their first division title in five years. Among the season highlights were the Dolphins' 19th and 20th consecutive wins over the Buffalo Bills. For the entire decade of the 1970s (1970–79), the Dolphins hold a perfect 20–0 record over the Bills, which contributed to O. J. Simpson never seeing any postseason success in his career. In the Divisional Playoffs, the Dolphins were no match for the Pittsburgh Steelers who jumped out to a 20–0 lead in the 1st Quarter to win 34–14 on their way to their second straight Super Bowl title.

The Dolphins failed to have a pro bowler this season.

Offseason

NFL draft

Personnel

Staff

Roster

Regular season

Schedule

Standings

Playoffs

AFC Divisional Playoff: at Pittsburgh Steelers

Awards and honors
Larry Csonka returned to the Dolphins in 1979 for one last season before retiring, after leaving in 1975 for the World Football League and spending the next three seasons after with the New York Giants.  He led the team with 837 rushing yards and 12 touchdowns, in addition to one receiving touchdown. His return led to him being named the NFL Comeback Player of the Year.

References

External links
 1979 Miami Dolphins at Pro-Football-Reference.com

Miami
Miami Dolphins seasons
AFC East championship seasons
Miami Dolphins